"I Got Lost in His Arms" is a song from the 1946 musical Annie Get Your Gun, written by Irving Berlin. It was performed by Ethel Merman in the original production of the musical.

In the torch song, Annie Oakley sings about the sensation of falling in love with Frank Butler.

Recordings
Judy Holliday - Trouble Is a Man (2001)
Stacey Kent - The Lyric (with Jim Tomlinson) (2005)
Julie London – Julie Is Her Name, Volume II (1958)
Liza Minnelli – Gently (1996)
Suzi Quatro – starred as Annie Oakley in the 1986 West End (London) production of Annie Get Your Gun; she sings the song on the album Annie Get Your Gun - 1986 London Cast (1986), the associated single "I Got Lost in His Arms" (1986), plus the compilation albums The Divas Collection (2003) and Songs from the Greatest Musicals (2008).

References

Songs from Annie Get Your Gun
Songs written by Irving Berlin
1946 songs
Liza Minnelli songs
Suzi Quatro songs